On 28 April 2021, a fire at a hostel in Riga, Latvia, killed nine people and wounded eight others.

Background 
Hostels in the Baltic state have been allowed to operate through the pandemic. 

The hostel building was located in the commercial center of Riga, and marketed as Japanese Style Centrum Riga with twenty-two available rooms. However, local authorities stated after the fire, it was technically a private apartment and lacked necessary fire safety and other permits. The hostel was crowded and some guests who stayed there in late 2020 and early 2021 said the conditions inside were poor. Reviews of the location mentioned small rooms, long term residents living alongside visiting tourists, people sleeping in the stairs and some rooms with no windows or ventilation.

The local public broadcaster released that the hostel had been on the radar of the police and State Fire and Rescue Service since March 2021 due to fire concerns and non-compliance with COVID-19 restrictions, and the hostel had been issued a €500 fine. In February 2021, officials who wanted to carry out a fire safety inspection were refused entry. The day prior to the fire, another individual was found dead in the hostel after a suspected drug overdose.

Fire 
Shortly after 4:30 am the fire broke out in Japanese Style Centrum, an illegal hostel on the fifth floor of a block of flats in the Latvian capital Riga. The fire brigade were called at 4:43 am. By the time of the arrival of the Latvian State Fire and Rescue Service the fire had spread to the sixth floor and roof. A survivor of the fire stated that they were awoken by an explosion and saw an orange light shinning underneath the door to their room, and they had to evacuate by crawling on their hands and knees.

The fire killed eight people - some of whom were foreign nationals - and injured another nine people with an additional fifteen individuals evacuated. Deputy Police Chief Andrejs Grisins told reporters that due to the injuries sustained by those that died in the fire DNA tests would be needed to confirm their identities.

Aftermath 
The Mayor of Riga, Mārtiņš Staķis, said the unauthorised hostel will be closed down. A criminal investigation into the fire was opened on the day it occurred.

See also
2021 Kharkiv fire
List of building or structure fires
Timeline of Riga

References

2021 fires in Europe
2021 in Latvia
April 2021 events in Europe
Building and structure fires in Europe
Disasters in Riga
Urban fires in Europe